The load, also known as a fodder, fother, and charrus ( "cartload"), is a historic English unit of weight or mass of various amounts, depending on the era, the substance being measured, and where it was being measured. The term was in use by the 13th century, and disappeared with legislation from the 1820s onwards. Modern equivalents of historical weights and measures are often very difficult to determine, and figures given here should be treated with caution.

Etymology

According to the Oxford English Dictionary, the word "fother" (noun) is derived from:

Lead load
In very general terms, a "load" or "fother" of metallic lead was approximately or exactly equal to one long ton of 2240 lbs (1016 kg), also equal to approximately one tonne. Fothers have been recorded from 2184 lbs (991 kg) to 2520 lbs (1143 kg).

According to the Tractatus de Ponderibus et Mensuris, a memorandum of Edward I (reigned 1272–1307), the load of metallic lead was 30 fotmals, 175 stone, or 2,100 Merchant pounds (approx. 1016 kg).

In Derbyshire up to the 13th century a fother of lead is recorded of 1680 lbs or 15 long hundredweight (cwt.) (approx. 762 kg), and likewise in Devon a load of lead weighed the same. An Act of Parliament of 31 Charles II (1660) stated that a fodder or fother of lead was one long ton, or 20 cwt. (1016 kg)

Other measures were also used for lead ore, e.g. the volumetric "dish" used in the Low Peak district of Derbyshire was 14 pints (weighing 58 lbs, 26 kg), but in the High Peak it was 15 or 16 pints.

Fothers were not used in all districts; for example in the Mendip Hills and in Burnley, Lancashire, tons, hundredweights and pounds were used in the first half of the 17th century.

By the early 19th century there was a vast multiplicity of local measurements of all types of goods, which a Parliamentary report of 1820 made clear. For plumbers, and in London, a fodder was 19½ cwt (now about 990 kg), and with miners generally 22½ cwt (now about 1140 kg). In Derbyshire a "mill fodder" was 2820 lbs (1280 kg), but when shipped at Stockwith-on-Trent, 2408 lbs (now about 1092 kg). In Hull it was 2340 lbs (1060 kg). In Northumberland a fother of pig lead was 21 cwt. (1066 kg), and in Newcastle sometimes 22 cwt (now about 1120 kg).

The fother was generally used by miners, shippers and smelters. When the metallic lead finally came to be sold it was weighed precisely; its value was calculated to the nearest pound weight and the price adjusted accordingly.

Straw load
The load of hay or straw was 36 trusses or 1,296 pounds (now about 588 kg).

Wood load
The American load of stacked firewood varied. A load of unhewn wood came to  cord-feet or  cubic feet (now about 0.75 m³), while a load of hewn wood came to  cord-feet or 43 cubic feet (now about 1.2 m³).

Wool load
The load of wool was 12 wey or 108.13 sacks (now about 1372 kg).

Dung and lime
In Northumberland in the 1820s, a fodder of dung or of lime was equal to a cartload pulled by two horses.

See also
 English, Imperial, and US customary units
 Weights and Measures Acts (UK)
 Derbyshire lead mining history

References

Citations

Bibliography
 
 
 

Customary units of measurement
Standards of the United Kingdom
Lead mining in the United Kingdom